von Behring is a small lunar impact crater that is located in the eastern part of the Moon. It lies north-northeast of the larger Kapteyn and is to the northwest of La Pérouse. The crater is circular and symmetrical, with an outer rim that is only lightly eroded. There is a small central peak at the midpoint of the interior floor.

The crater was formerly designated Maclaurin F before being renamed by the IAU in 1979.

References

 
 
 
 
 
 
 
 
 
 
 
 

Impact craters on the Moon